The following is a list of state highways in the U.S. state of Louisiana designated in the 350-399 range.


Louisiana Highway 350

Louisiana Highway 350 (LA 350) runs  in an east–west direction, connecting LA 31 and LA 347 via a vertical lift bridge over Bayou Teche in Parks, St. Martin Parish.

Louisiana Highway 351

Louisiana Highway 351 (LA 351) runs  in an east–west direction, connecting LA 31 and LA 347 via a bridge over Bayou Teche near Ruth, St. Martin Parish.

Louisiana Highway 352

Louisiana Highway 352 (LA 352) runs  from Lake Fausse Pointe State Park to Henderson.

Louisiana Highway 353

Louisiana Highway 353 (LA 353) runs  in a northwest to southeast direction from LA 94 near Lafayette, Lafayette Parish to LA 31 in St. Martinville, St. Martin Parish.

Louisiana Highway 354

Louisiana Highway 354 (LA 354) runs  in a southwest to northeast direction from a junction with LA 341 to LA 31 in St. Martin Parish.

Louisiana Highway 355

Louisiana Highway 355 (LA 355) runs  in an east–west direction, connecting LA 31 and LA 347 via a bridge over Bayou Teche in Cecilia, St. Martin Parish.

Louisiana Highway 356

Louisiana Highway 356 (LA 356) runs  in an east–west direction from LA 95 southeast of Church Point, Acadia Parish to LA 93 north of Cankton, St. Landry Parish.

Louisiana Highway 357

Louisiana Highway 357 (LA 357) runs  in a north–south direction from LA 178 east of Church Point, Acadia Parish to US 190 in Opelousas, St. Landry Parish.

Louisiana Highway 358

Louisiana Highway 359

Louisiana Highway 360

Louisiana Highway 361

Louisiana Highway 362

Louisiana Highway 363

Louisiana Highway 364

Louisiana Highway 364 (LA 364) consisted of a pontoon bridge across Bayou Lafourche in Mathews, Lafourche Parish.

It was an undivided two-lane highway for its entire length.

In the pre-1955 state highway system, LA 364 was designated as State Route C-2074. The Mathews Pontoon Bridge was closed and demolished as soon as its replacement was opened.

Louisiana Highway 365

Louisiana Highway 365 (LA 365) runs  in a general east–west direction from LA 370 east of Iota to LA 98 east of Mire, Acadia Parish.

The route heads east from LA 370 and makes a zigzag via LA 13.  Continuing east through Branch, LA 365 intersects LA 35 southwest of Church Point.  East of Branch, LA 365 passes through a point known as Higginbotham and intersects LA 95.  The highway then zigzags to the southeast and reaches the St. Landry Parish line.  Here, it turns due south and proceeds to a point on LA 98 between Mire and Carencro.

Louisiana Highway 366

Louisiana Highway 366 (LA 366) runs  in a northwest to southeast direction along Patterson Street from US 165 to LA 8 in Pollock, Grant Parish.

Louisiana Highway 367

Louisiana Highway 368

Louisiana Highway 370

Louisiana Highway 371

Louisiana Highway 371 (LA 371) ran  in a general north–south direction from US 190 in Basile to LA 104 northeast of Basile.

The route was renumbered in 1994 from its original designation to LA 3277 to prevent a numerical duplication with the newly commissioned US 371.

Louisiana Highway 372

Louisiana Highway 374

Louisiana Highway 376

Louisiana Highway 377

Louisiana Highway 378

Louisiana Highway 378 (LA 378) runs  in a southwest to northeast direction from I-10 in Westlake to US 171 in Moss Bluff, Calcasieu Parish.  The route has a spur that travels  along Sam Houston Jones Parkway to Sutherland Road in Sam Houston Jones State Park.

The route heads north from exit 27 on I-10 and travels along Sampson Street, an undivided four-lane highway with a center turning lane, through the city of Westlake.  North of town, LA 378 narrows to two lanes and makes a zigzag east onto Phillips Road and north onto Davis Road to cross a vertical lift bridge over the West Fork of the Calcasieu River.  Curving due east onto Sam Houston Jones Parkway, the route again widens to four lanes with a center lane and intersects LA 378 Spur, which provides access to Sam Houston Jones State Park.  LA 378 continues east to its terminus at US 171 in the unincorporated community of Moss Bluff.

Louisiana Highway 379

Louisiana Highway 380

Louisiana Highway 380 (LA 380) runs  in an east–west direction from LA 99 south of Welsh to LA 26 in Lake Arthur, Jefferson Davis Parish.

Louisiana Highway 382

Louisiana Highway 382 (LA 382) runs  in a north–south direction from LA 380 east of Thornwell to US 90 east of Welsh, Jefferson Davis Parish.

Louisiana Highway 383

Louisiana Highway 384

Louisiana Highway 385

Louisiana Highway 386

Louisiana Highway 387

Louisiana Highway 389

Louisiana Highway 390

Louisiana Highway 390 (LA 390) runs  in an east–west direction along West Main Street from Maggie Hebert Road, a local road, to LA 27 in Hackberry, Cameron Parish.

Louisiana Highway 392

Louisiana Highway 394

Louisiana Highway 395

Louisiana Highway 397

Louisiana Highway 398

Louisiana Highway 399

Louisiana Highway 399 (LA 399) runs  in a north–south direction from LA 112 northwest of Sugartown, Beauregard Parish to a local road north of Fullerton, Vernon Parish.

The route heads north from LA 112 and crosses from Beauregard Parish into Vernon Parish. LA 399 turns east to follow LA 10 briefly before resuming a northeastern course to Fullerton. Here it intersects LA 458 and turns north to continue the route of that highway past Fullerton Lake to the end of state maintenance at Lookout Road, a local road. The northernmost section of the route is located within the Vernon Unit of the Kisatchie National Forest. LA 112 is an undivided two-lane highway for its entire length.

References

External links
La DOTD State, District, and Parish Maps